Damavand County is located in Tehran province, Iran. The capital of the county is Damavand. At the 2006 census, the county's population was 96,860, in 27,419 households. The following census in 2011 counted 100,690 people, in 30,060 households. At the 2016 census, the county's population was 125,480, in 39,373 households.

Administrative divisions

The population history of Damavand County's administrative divisions over three consecutive censuses is shown in the following table. The latest census shows two districts, five rural districts, and five cities.

References

 

Counties of Tehran Province